Nolan Pillar is a rock pinnacle (1,940 m) standing 3 nautical miles (6 km) southeast of Smith Knob and marking the east extremity of the Thiel Mountains, Antarctica. The name was proposed by Peter Bermel and Arthur Ford, co-leaders of the United States Geological Survey (USGS) Thiel Mountains party which surveyed these mountains in 1960–61. Named for Thomas B. Nolan, seventh director of the U.S. Geological Survey, 1956–65.

References 

Rock formations of Ellsworth Land